Damir Maratovich Sadikov (born 12 July 1991) is a Russian former professional football player.

Club career
He made his debut in the Russian Premier League on 26 March 2010 for FC Amkar Perm.

External links

References

1991 births
Footballers from Moscow
Living people
Russian footballers
Russian Premier League players
FC Amkar Perm players
FC Tyumen players
FC Metallurg Lipetsk players
Association football forwards